Annakodiyum Aindhu Pengalum is a 2015  Tamil soap opera that aired on Zee Tamil. The show is set to launch on 23 February 2015 and 16 December 2016 airs Monday through Friday 7:00PM IST. Starting from Monday 27 December 2016, the show was shifted to 10:00PM IST for 460 episodes.

Starring Thendral and Office Serial Fame Shruthi Raj acting Female lead role. Story of the protagonist and her five sisters who come to Tamil Nadu in search of their father from Kerala and how their life takes turns there after The show directed by Cheyyar Ravi.

Plot
Annakodiyum Ainthu Pengalum is an aspiring story of Annakodi and her five daughters. Gauri, the eldest daughter of Annakodi and Muthupandi is in search for an identity for her mother, herself and siblings as her mother being the second wife of Muthupandi is ill-treated by people around her, in spite of her step mother Pandiamma supporting them. How Gowri, a lawyer by profession tackles all the hurdles is captured as an interesting story. Gowri's role model in life is Uma Maheshwari, the leading lawyer in the town. Destiny lands her as the daughter-in-law of Uma Maheshwari where she faces threat to practice her profession. How she takes over her role model and fights all injustice forms the rest of the story.

Cast
 Sathish as Muthupandi, Gowri, Kavitha, Manohari, Shankari & Eshwari's father
 Deepa as Pandiamma, Muthupandi's 1st wife
 Lakshmi / Kavitha as Annakodi, Muthupandi's 2nd wife
 Vibhu Raman as Siddarth
 Shruthi Raj as Advocate Gowri Siddarth
 Venkat as Vel Murugan
 Sridevi Ashok as police inspector, Manohari
 Dharish Jayaseelan  as Dass (Shankari's husband)
 Bhagya as Shankari Dass
 Mahalakshmi as Kavitha
 Guhan Shanmugham as Thangadurai 
 Veena Venkatesh as Advocate Uma Maheswari 
 Akhila as Kanchana Thangadurai 
 Sherin Thaha as Leelavathi
 Sivan Sreenivasan as Shenbagapandi, Muthupandi's elder brother
 Srividhya Shankar as Shenbagapandi's wife
 Veera as Kanchana's father
 Sasi Anand as Kanchana's uncle

References

External links
 

Zee Tamil original programming
Tamil-language legal television series
2015 Tamil-language television series debuts
Tamil-language melodrama television series
Tamil-language television shows
2016 Tamil-language television series endings
Television shows set in Tamil Nadu